Andrea Schöpp (born 27 February 1965) is a German curler from Garmisch-Partenkirchen. She lectures part-time in statistics at the University of Munich.

Career
Schöpp is a two-time World champion ( and ), seven-time European champion and 1992 Winter Olympics champion (demonstration). Schöpp has skipped every team she has played for in international events - except when she plays at the European Mixed Curling Championships, where she usually plays third for her brother, Rainer.

Schöpp made her international debut in 1980, at the age of 15. She skipped the German team to a bronze medal at the European championships that year. She also won silver medals at the Worlds in 1986 and 1987 and a bronze in 1989. She continues to curl, although she has had less success in the last decade. Her fourth-place finish at the 2006 Ford World Women's Curling Championship was her highest placement since 1996 at the Worlds.

Schöpp won a gold medal at the 2008 European Mixed Curling Championship as a part of the team skipped by her brother Rainer.

Personal life
Schöpp studied statistics at the University of Munich and earned her diploma in 1991. She completed her doctorate in 1996, and has been employed by the University of Munich from 1991.

Schöpp's brother, Rainer Schöpp, is also a curler.

She was born hours before her longtime teammate, Monika Wagner, in the same hospital.

Teammates

Works
Alternative Parametrisierungen Bei Korrelierten Bivariaten Binären Responsevariablen. Vol. 1, Anwendungsorientierte Statistik. 1997.

References

External links

 
 
 Andrea Schöpp - Player Profile - Curling - Eurosport UK

Living people
1965 births
Sportspeople from Garmisch-Partenkirchen
German female curlers
Olympic gold medalists for Germany
Medalists at the 1992 Winter Olympics
Curlers at the 1988 Winter Olympics
Curlers at the 1992 Winter Olympics
Curlers at the 1998 Winter Olympics
Curlers at the 2010 Winter Olympics
Olympic curlers of Germany
World curling champions
European curling champions
German curling champions
Continental Cup of Curling participants